Duane Roland (December 3, 1952 – June 19, 2006) was an American guitarist for the Southern hard rock band Molly Hatchet. He was a member of the band from its founding in the mid-1970s until his departure in 1990. During that time he recorded seven albums with the band. He is credited with co-writing some of the band's biggest hits, including "Bloody Reunion" and "Boogie No More". After leaving the band he played with the Southern Rock Allstars and Gator Country, which included many of the founding members of Molly Hatchet.

Death
Roland died at his home in St. Augustine, Florida of natural causes at the age of 53.
Drummer Bruce Crump said Roland was the anchor of Molly Hatchet during the 1980s, a time when the band's lineup was constantly changing. "During all that time, Duane was the constant," said Crump. "I can't imagine playing Molly Hatchet music without Duane Roland. It just wouldn't be the same."

References

1952 births
2006 deaths
People from Jeffersonville, Indiana
American rock guitarists
American male guitarists
Lead guitarists
American Southern Rock musicians
Molly Hatchet members
20th-century American guitarists
Guitarists from Indiana
20th-century American male musicians